Tabernaemontana wullschlaegelii is a species of plant in the family Apocynaceae. It is endemic to Jamaica.

References

wullschlaegelii
Endemic flora of Jamaica
Taxonomy articles created by Polbot